Draževo is a village in the municipality of Novo Selo, North Macedonia.

Demographics
According to the 2002 census, the village had a total of 462 inhabitants. Ethnic groups in the village include:

Macedonians 460
Serbs 1
Others 1

References

Villages in Novo Selo Municipality